STAR syndrome is a rare X-linked dominant disorder. Its core features include toe syndactyly, telecanthus and anogenital and renal malformations.  The underlying cause is mutation in the FAM58A gene. There have currently been 10 cases reported.

References

External links 

Syndromes